Wallace Frank "Wally" Gustafson (January 21, 1925 – September 10, 2018) was an American lawyer and politician.

Biography
Gustafson was born in Palmyra Township, Renville County, Minnesota and graduated from Bird Island High School, in Bird Island, Minnesota, in 1942. He served in the United States Navy in the Pacific during World War II. He received his bachelor's degree in business administration and his law degree from University of Minnesota in 190. Gustafson practices law in Willmar, Minnesota. Gustafson served in the Minnesota House of Representatives from 1963 to 1972 and was involved in the Republican Party. Gustafson died at St. Cloud Hospital in St. Cloud, Minnesota.

Notes

External links

1925 births
2018 deaths
People from Renville County, Minnesota
People from Willmar, Minnesota
Military personnel from Minnesota
University of Minnesota Law School alumni
Minnesota lawyers
Republican Party members of the Minnesota House of Representatives
20th-century American lawyers
Carlson School of Management alumni
United States Navy personnel of World War II